Inna (Инна) is a European given name. It was the name of an early East Orthodox male martyr (see :ru:Инна, Пинна и Римма), but is currently used as a feminine name only. In ancient Greece, the name Ἴννα (Inna) is also attested (probably from ἴννην innen, meaning "little girl"), however a connection with the Russian Inna has not been confirmed.

People named Inna
Inna (born Elena Alexandra Apostoleanu, 1986), Romanian singer
Inna Bulkina (1963–2021), Ukrainian literary critic, writer and editor
Inna Braverman, Israeli entrepreneur and businesswoman
Inna Brayer, amateur ballroom dancer 
Inna Churikova (born 1943), Soviet and Russian actress
Inna Derusova (1970–2022), Ukrainian military medic
Inna Dorofeieva (born 1965), Ukrainian ballerina
Inna Gaponenko (born 1976), Ukrainian chess player
Inna Gliznuta (born 1973), Moldovan Olympic high jumper
Inna Lisnyanskaya, Jewish-Russian poet from USSR, later Russia
Inna Meiman-Kitrossky (1932–1987), refusenik
Inna Modja (born 1984), Malian-French female singer and model
Inna Mozhevitina (born 1985), Kazakh biathlete
Inna Osypenko-Radomska (born 1982), Ukrainian/Azerbaijani sprint kayaker
Inna Palacios (born 1994), Filipino football player
Inna Poluškina (born 1984), Latvian long-distance runner
Inna Sovsun, Ukrainian professor and politician
Inna Tumanyan (1929-2005), Soviet-Armenian film director
Inna Vernikov (born 1984), American politician
Inna Yaitskaya (born 1979), Russian Olympic swimmer
Inna Yoffe (born 1988), Israeli Olympic synchronized swimmer
Inna Zhukova (born 1986), Belarusian Olympic rhythmic gymnast
Inna Zubkovskaya (1923–2001), Soviet and Russian ballerina

See also
Inna (disambiguation)

References

Russian feminine given names
Slavic feminine given names
Ukrainian feminine given names